Ptyongnathosia pectinata is a species of moth of the family Tortricidae. It is found in Napo Province, Ecuador.

The wingspan is 14–16 mm. The ground colour of the forewings is cream, somewhat mixed with brownish and with indistinct pale ochreous-brownish suffusions and sparse brown dots. The hindwings are white cream with some grey spots.

Etymology
The species name refers to the comb-like sclerite of the valve and is derived from Latin pecten (meaning a comb).

References

Moths described in 2007
Euliini
Moths of South America
Taxa named by Józef Razowski